Zanuk (also Romanized as Zanūk, Zenyūk, Zanoog, Zenūk, Zeynūk, and Zinūk) is a village in Barakuh Rural District, Jolgeh-e Mazhan District, Khusf County, South Khorasan Province, Iran. At the 2006 census, its population was 75, in 25 families.

References 

Populated places in Khusf County